Michael Barr (died 25 April 2016) was a 35-year-old Irishman who was shot dead in a pub in Dublin as part of the Hutch–Kinahan feud. Four people have been convicted of his murder.

Background
Barr was originally from Strabane, County Tyrone, but moved to Dublin, living in Finglas, then the north inner city at the time of his death.

He had pled guilty to handling stolen electrical equipment at Finnstown House Hotel in Lucan, Dublin. He had also been charged with membership of an unlawful organisation calling itself the Irish Republican Army, the IRA or Óglaigh na hÉireann, but the state dropped these charges when he pled guilty to handling the stolen equipment.  He was an Irish Republican.

Shooting
Barr was shot in the Sunset House Bar in Summerhill, Dublin, on 25 April 2016. The Garda Síochána suspect he was killed by the Kinahan gang because of involvement with the shooting of David Byrne at the Regency Hotel in February 2016. There was also speculation that the intended target was a member of the Hutch family drinking in the bar at the time.
Michael Barr was cleared of any involvement in the murder of David Byrne in the Regency Hotel Dublin by the Garda.

On the same night, Thomas Farnan was shot dead at Kilcronan estate in Clondalkin. This was not linked to the gang feud.

Aftermath

Funeral
His funeral was held in his home town with around 1,500 people turning out for it. Roughly a dozen men in paramilitary-style uniforms accompanied the funeral cortege to the church, and black flags were placed on lamp posts along part of the route. Fifteen people were arrested at the funeral. Police on both sides of the border were alert.

The parish priest, Fr. Michael Doherty, who performed the funeral mass, sent a message to support to those affected by criminal gangs and said that the people of Strabane supported those of north inner-city Dublin facing violence.

Arrests and trials
A man was arrested and charged with the murder of Michael Barr on 28 May 2016 at the Bridewell Garda station. A Garda witness told the court that the accused made no response when arrested and charged. The accused was granted free legal aid and remanded in custody to appear before Cloverhill District Court on Friday 3 June 2016. On 9 March, a second man has been charged at the Special Criminal Court in relation to the murder of Michael Barr at the Sunset House in. Martin Aylmer, 31, of Casino Park, Marino, was charged with participating in or contributing to activity intending to facilitate the commission by a criminal organisation or any of its members of a serious offence, namely the murder of Michael Barr at the Sunset House, Summerhill Parade, Dublin 1 on 25 April 2016.

He was also charged with participating in or contributing to activity being reckless, as to whether said participation or contribution could facilitate the commission of the murder of Mr Barr.

The offences are alleged to have occurred between 23 April and 25 April 2016.

On 29 January 2018, the nonjury Special Criminal Court in Dublin found Eamonn Cumberton (30) guilty of the murder of Michael Barr and sentenced him to life imprisonment.
It was later revealed that Cumberton was suspected of carrying out several more murders and suspected murders and of being a leading member of the INLA. Michael Barr had been threatened many times by the INLA when he lived in Strabane, it has also been revealed. It is also believed that a convicted murderer and leading INLA member from Dundalk gave the go-ahead to the INLA leader in Dublin.

On 11 September 2020, David Hunter, originally from Liverpool, was convicted of Barr's murder by the Special Criminal Court. In November 2020 Hunter was jailed for life, backdated to April 2019.

In December 2020 a 36-year-old man was due to appear in court, charged with Barr's murder. The man had been arrested at a house in north Dublin on 21 December 2020.

References

2016 deaths
People murdered in the Republic of Ireland
Deaths by firearm in the Republic of Ireland
Deaths by person in the Republic of Ireland
Irish murder victims
People murdered by Irish organized crime
Organised crime events in Ireland
April 2016 crimes in Europe
April 2016 events in Ireland
2016 murders in the Republic of Ireland